Syzygium chavaran is a species of plant in the family Myrtaceae. It is endemic to India.

References

Flora of India (region)
chavaran
Endangered plants
Taxonomy articles created by Polbot